The Kleinwaltersdorfer Bach is a 7.6-kilomentre-long, left tributary of the Freiberger Mulde in Saxony, Germany. The stream is assessed as moderately polluted (GKL II).

Course 
The stream, locally known as the Waltersbach, rises in Freiberg's Hospital Wood (Hospitalwald) and flows from there northwards through the village of Kleinwaltersdorf. After Kleinwaltersdorf it snakes its way through a water meadow landscape to Großschirma, where it empties into the Freiberger Mulde.

The villagers of Kleinwaltersdorf call the Waltersbach "the stream" (die Bach).

Literature 
 Flusslandschaft Kleinwaltersdorfer Bach – Kartierung, Analyse, Bewertung. In: Zeitschrift für Angewandte Geoökologie der TU Bergakademie Freiberg. 1/2004.

See also
List of rivers of Saxony

References 

Rivers of Saxony
Freiberg
Rivers of Germany